Ice XII is a metastable, dense, crystalline phase of solid water, a type of ice. Ice XII was first reported in 1996 by C. Lobban, J.L. Finney and W.F. Kuhs and, after initial caution, was properly identified in 1998.

Ice XII was discovered existing within the phase stability region of ice V. Later research showed that ice XII could be created outside that range.

While it is similar in density (1.29 g/cm3 at ) to ice IV (also found in the ice V space) it exists as a tetragonal crystal. Topologically it is a mix of seven- and eight-membered rings, a 4-connected net (4-coordinate sphere packing)—the densest possible arrangement without hydrogen bond interpenetration.

Ordinary water ice is known as ice Ih, (in the Bridgman nomenclature). Different types of ice, from ice II to ice XVI, have been created in the laboratory at different temperatures and pressures.

Ice XIV

When hydrochloric-acid-doped ice XII is cooled down to about 110 K, it undergoes a phase transition into a partially hydrogen-ordered phase, namely ice XIV. The transition entropy from ice XIV to ice XII is estimated to be 60% of Pauling entropy based on DSC measurements. The formation of ice XIV from ice XII is more favoured at high pressure.

See also
Ice for other crystalline form of ice

References 

 C. Lobban, J.L. Finney and W.F. Kuhs, The structure of a new phase of ice, Nature 391, 268–270, 1998

Water ice